The Sanderson Farms Championship is a professional golf tournament on the PGA Tour, played annually in Mississippi. It moved to the Country Club of Jackson in Jackson in autumn 2014, early in the 2015 season.

The tournament has been part of the PGA Tour schedule since 1968, and has raised more than $8.1 million for statewide charities. Originally played at the Hattiesburg Country Club in Hattiesburg, the event moved in 1994 to Annandale Golf Club in Madison, which hosted through 2013.

Since 2013, the tournament's title sponsor has been Sanderson Farms, a poultry farming corporation based in Laurel, Mississippi. The tournament's host organization, Century Club Charities, is a non-profit, tax-exempt 501(c)(3) organization whose mission is promoting the game of golf for the benefit of charity. The Sanderson Farms Championship's primary charity is Friends of Children's Hospital, which benefits the Batson's Children Hospital.

Course
The Country Club of Jackson opened in 1914. It is a private club with 27 championship holes, 18 of which were re-designed by John Fought in 2008 and measure  from the championship tees.

History
Known as the Magnolia Classic from 1968 through 1985 with notable winners including Roger Maltbie, Craig Stadler, and Payne Stewart, the tournament was renamed the Deposit Guaranty Golf Classic in 1986. From 1999 to 2006, it was known as the Southern Farm Bureau Classic, from 2007 to 2011 as the Viking Classic, and in 2012 as the True South Classic.

In the past, this tournament was generally played opposite of a major or limited field tournament (officially termed an "alternate event" by the PGA Tour). It later became part of the Fall Series, a group of events held after The Tour Championship, before returning to its former status as an alternate event in 2011. In either case, the leading players in men's professional golf rarely participate. Until 1994, it was played opposite the Masters Tournament and then opposite The Open Championship in the mid-1990s. More recently, it played opposite various World Golf Championships and The Tour Championship. From 2007 to 2010, it generally played opposite the major team events involving PGA Tour players, namely the Ryder Cup and Presidents Cup. In 2011, it returned to the PGA Tour regular season opposite the British Open in July.

It has been an official money event on the PGA Tour since 1994. Prior to that, it was a satellite event with the money counting but the wins counting as unofficial, except from 1983 to 1985, when it was instead part of the developmental Tournament Players Series.

From 2007 to 2010, it was part of the Fall Series. Because the FedEx Cup season championship was already determined by that time, elite players generally passed on Fall Series events; most players in the tournament were trying to either make the Top 125 on the money list and retain their tour cards, or earn a quick two-year exemption by winning. The 2007 event was played in the same week as the Presidents Cup; most of the top Tour players played in that event instead of the Viking Classic. The situation was similar in 2008, with the tournament being scheduled opposite the Ryder Cup. The 2009 purse was due to be $3,700,000, with $666,000 going to the winner. That year's event was also to be the first in the tournament's recent history to be the sole event on the PGA Tour schedule for that week, as it had been moved to the end of October with a scheduled finish on November 1. However, the tournament was canceled on October 31, due to unplayable conditions at the Annandale Golf Club. The event was not rescheduled. The 2010 event was again held opposite the Ryder Cup. This would be the tournament's last fall edition, as it would move into the regular season the following year. In 2013, the title sponsor changed to Sanderson Farms.  The tournament was not held in the 2013–14 season because of the new PGA Tour wraparound season;  the 2014 tournament, part of the 2014–15 season, moved to late October and was played opposite the WGC-HSBC Champions in China.

As an alternate event, the winner did not receive an invitation to the Masters Tournament, but did earn a trip to the PGA Championship, a two-year PGA Tour exemption, a minimum of 24 OWGR points, and 300 FedEx Cup points. For the 2019–20 season, the tournament was upgraded from an alternate event to a full status event; it was also rescheduled to September, as the second tournament of the PGA Tour season. Along with an increased prize fund, the changed of status meant the winner receives the full benefits of a regular PGA Tour event, with 500 FedEx Cup points and an invitation to The Masters.

Over the years, the Sanderson Farms Championship has been played opposite a number of different tournaments:

Winners

Multiple winners
Three men have won this tournament twice:
Dwight Nevil: 1973, 1974
Brian Henninger: 1994, 1999
Fred Funk: 1998, 2004

See also
Mississippi Sports Hall of Fame & Museum ("Viking Classic Exhibit")

Notes

References

External links

Coverage on the PGA Tour's official site

PGA Tour events
Golf in Mississippi
Recurring sporting events established in 1968
1968 establishments in Mississippi